Sons of the Legion is a 1938 American drama film directed by James P. Hogan and starring Lynne Overman, Evelyn Keyes and Tim Holt. Its plot concerns a group of boys looking to start a S.A.L. squadron. However, because a boy's father wrongfully received a dishonorable discharge after the Great War, his father cannot join the American Legion and in turn the son cannot join the squadron.

Cast

Production
Tim Holt was loaned to Paramount from Walter Wanger. Filming started June 30, 1938.

References

External links 
 
 

1930s English-language films
1938 films
1930s war films
American black-and-white films
American Legion
American World War I films
Films directed by James Patrick Hogan
Paramount Pictures films
1930s American films